Apocalipsis is a 2018 adventure game developed by Punch Punk Games and published by Klabater. The game was released for Microsoft Windows, macOS, PlayStation 4, Xbox One and Nintendo Switch on February 8, 2018.

Reception 
Apocalipsis received "mixed or average" reviews, according to review aggregator Metacritic.

Colin Campbell from Polygon said, "[Apocalipsis'] puzzles, its art and its atmosphere feel authentically medieval, while its story splashes in the dark waters of stoicism."

Richard Hoover from Adventure Gamers said, "A compelling if somewhat easy puzzler with a unique aesthetic inspired by medieval engravings, Apocalipsis has that melancholic appeal of a Grimm’s fairy tale on a rainy day."

References

External links 
 

2018 video games
Adventure games
Klabater games
MacOS games
Nintendo Switch games
PlayStation 4 games
Single-player video games
Video games developed in Poland
Windows games
Xbox One games